Sandra Jauregui (born 1983) is a Democratic member of the Nevada Assembly. She represents the 41st district, which covers parts of the southern Las Vegas Valley.

Early life and education
Jauregui was born in 1983 in Monterey Park, California, and raised in nearby Hacienda Heights. She is Latina. Jauregui attended Mt. San Antonio College and graduated from the University of Nevada, Las Vegas.

Career 
Jauregui works for Ticor Title of Nevada and previously worked for former U.S. Senator Harry Reid.

Jauregui ran for the open seat vacated by the retiring Victoria A. Dooling in 2016. She defeated former Assemblyman Paul Aizley in the Democratic primary and Republican Nick Phillips in the general election.

Legislative history
Juaregui's inaugural legislative session began with becoming the primary sponsor of AB291. A proposed bill to repeal state preemption laws concerning firearm ownership in the state of Nevada. The bill has been represented prohibiting certain acts relating to the modification of semiautomatic firearms, including trigger mechanisms and bump stocks. Other language of AB291 pertains to reducing the concentration of alcohol that may be present in the blood or breath of a person while in possession of a firearm. AB291 also pertains to repealing state law protections and grants the authority to regulate ammunition and firearms laws at county level.

AB 291 was scheduled to not complete the time requirement to pass legislative deadlines. AB 291 was granted an exemption, and the preemption repeal was stricken from the bill on May 29, 2019, at the request of Everytown for Gun Safety. The bill added language to accept "Red Flag Law" in Nevada. A high-risk protection order that has been controversially touted as lacking due process and constitutionality, while support voiced concerns for safety measures. During the Senate Judiciary Meetings, Nevada constituents raised concerns with Sandra Juaregui's controversial acceptance from Everytown for Gun Safety, in the amount of $10,000. Protests have ensued over this bill across the state of Nevada since its introduction. The bill was signed into law by Nevada Governor Steve Sisolak on June 14, 2019.

Electoral history

References

External links
 
 Campaign website
 Legislative website

1983 births
21st-century American politicians
21st-century American women politicians
Democratic Party members of the Nevada Assembly
Hispanic and Latino American state legislators in Nevada
Hispanic and Latino American women in politics
Living people
Mt. San Antonio College alumni
People from Hacienda Heights, California
People from Monterey Park, California
Politicians from Las Vegas
University of Nevada, Las Vegas alumni
Women state legislators in Nevada